Thomas Muir may refer to:
Thomas Muir (mathematician) (1844–1934), Scottish mathematician
Thomas Muir of Huntershill (1765–1799), political reformer, leader of the Scottish "Friends of the People Society"